The qaṣīda (also spelled qaṣīdah; is originally an Arabic word , plural qaṣā’id, ; that was passed to some other languages such as  or , chakameh, and ) is an ancient Arabic word and form of writing poetry, often translated as ode, passed to other cultures after the Arab Muslim expansion. The word qasidah is still used in its original birthplace, Arabia, and in all Arab countries.

Well known qasā'id include the Seven Mu'allaqat and Qasida Burda ("Poem of the Mantle") by Imam al-Busiri and Ibn Arabi's classic collection "The Interpreter of Desires".

The classic form of qasida maintains a single elaborate metre throughout the poem, and every line rhymes on the same sound. It typically runs from fifteen to eighty lines, and sometimes more than a hundred. The genre originates in Arabic poetry and was adopted by Persian poets, where it developed to be sometimes longer than a hundred lines.

Form

Arabic qaṣīda means "intention" and the genre found use as a petition to a patron. A qaṣīda has a single presiding subject, logically developed and concluded. Often it is a panegyric, written in praise of a king or a nobleman, a genre known as madīḥ, meaning "praise".

In his ninth-century "Book of Poetry and Poets" (Kitab al-shi'r wa-al-shu'ara) the Arabian writer Ibn Qutaybah describes the (Arabic) qasida as being constituted of three parts:

 The nasīb: a nostalgic opening in which the poet reflects on what has passed. A common theme is the pursuit by the poet of the caravan of his beloved: by the time he reaches their camp-site they have already moved on.
 The raḥīl or travel section: a release or disengagement (takhallus), often achieved by the poet describing his transition from the nostalgia of the nasīb to contemplating the harshness of the land and life away from the tribe.
 The message of the poem, which can take several forms: praise of the tribe (fakhr) or a ruler (madīḥ), satire about other tribes (hija) or some moral maxim (hikam).

While many poets have intentionally or unintentionally deviated from this plan it is recognisable in many. From the Abbasid period onwards, two-part qaṣīda forms containing just a nasīb and madīḥ have been dominant.

Bengali
Qasidas were introduced to Dhaka, and later the rest of Bengal, during the Mughal era by Persians. Subahdar of Bengal, Islam Khan Chisti's naval fleet is said to have sung them after arriving in Jessore in 1604. In 1949, Hakim Habibur Rahman spoke of the recent revival of qasidas since that period in his book, Dhaka Panchas Baras Pahle (Dhaka, fifty years ago). The qasidas were promoted by nawabs and sardars across the region, and especially popular during the Islamic month of Ramadan. An old tradition of Old Dhaka is during the time of sehri, groups of people would sing qasidas to wake up the Muslims in the neighbourhood.

Burushaski
In Burushaski, the Qasida refers broadly to Isma'ili devotional literature in general rather than a specific style of poetry and is interchangeably used with the word Ginan in the language. It was regularly performed in the jamat-khana and has been a cornerstone of Ismaili practics in the Hunza Valley. The Burushaski Qasida is used extensively to describe Ismaili philosophy, theology, and hermeneutics in a vernacular language. Furthermore, the Qasida builds upon classical Isma'ili thought, with original theological, metaphysical, and teleological expositions that draw on the historically unprecedented philosophical injunctions of the Ismaili Imams.

The Burushaski Qasida has had a pivotal role in developing the Burushaski language. Burushaski had been a broken, oral tongue, without a written script. This changed in 1961, 'Allamah Hunzai published his first poetry collection, entitled Nagmah-yi Israfil, which featured a selection of his Burushaski poems. The collection was telegrammed in the same year to the 49th Isma'ili Imam, Shah Karim al-Husayni, who, in his response, ascribed to 'Allamah Hunzai's collection the status of a "ginan book in the Burushaski language."

As van-Skyhawk notes this had the effect of sacralizing 'Allamah Hunzai's poetry for the Isma'ilis, and thus his poems were and continue to be widely recited in Isma'ili jama'at-khanas following this exchange.’  Apart from Allama Hunzai, leading Burushaki Qasida poets include Aalijah Ghulamuddin Hunzai and Wazir Fida Ali Esar.

Below is an excerpt from, “Noor-e-shama”, one of Allama Hunzai’s most popular Burushaski Qasida:

In 2013, the recitation of Burushaski ginans was discouraged at Isma'ili jamat khanas by regional councils.  However, Burushaski Qasidas continue to be sung at Dawaat (traditional house warming), zikr-mehfil, and other similar private religious gatherings. Several artists such as Meher-Angez, Barkat Ali, Shakila Parveen, Islam Habib, and Noman Asmet are recording and publishing Burushaski Qasida on streaming platforms online. These renditions have amassed millions of views. Many of these recording are accompanied with a chardah and a daff, which are instruments inspired by Central Asian Isma'ili traditions.

Indonesian

In Indonesia, qasidah (Indonesian spelling: kasidah) refers broadly to Islamic music in general, rather than a specific style or poetry.  Traditional qasidah was historically limited to Arab immigrant and pious Muslim neighbourhoods.  Modern qasidah has broadened to include influence from Western and local Indonesian music.

Persian
After the 10th century Iranians developed the qasida immensely and used it for other purposes. For example, Nasir Khusraw used it extensively for philosophical, theological, and ethical purposes, while Avicenna also used it to express philosophical ideas. It may be a spring poem (Persian بهاریه, bahâriye) or autumn poem (Persian خزانیه, xazâniye). The opening is usually description of a natural event: the seasons, a natural landscape or an imaginary sweetheart. In the takhallos poets usually address themselves by their pen-name. Then the last section is the main purpose of the poet in writing the poem.

Persian exponents include:
 
 Farrokhi Sistani, the court poet of Mahmud of Ghazni (11th century), especially his 'Hunting Scene' (in Persian: قصیده شکارگاه)
 Manuchehri (11th century), who was court poet for Manuchehr ruler of Tabaristan, and later for Mas'ud I of Ghazni. One of his qasidas is The Turkish harpist
 Masud Sa'd Salman (12th century) who was wrongfully imprisoned on the suspicion of treason
 Anvari Abiverdi, (12th century) especially his petition for help against the invasion of Mongols
 Khaghani Shervani (12th century)
 and in the 20th century, Mohammad Taghi Bahar with his innovations in using the qasida for political purposes.

From the 14th century CE Persian poets became more interested in ghazal and the qasida declined. The ghazal developed from the first part of qasida in which poets praised their sweethearts. Mystical poets and Sufis used the ghazal for mystical purposes.

Yazidi
The qesîde is a type of oral religious poem in Yazidi literature, considered to have been composed by the disciples of Sheikh Adi.

Urdu
Qasida in Urdu poetry is often panegyric, sometimes a satire, sometimes dealing with an important event. As a rule it is longer than the ghazal but follows the same system of rhyme.

West African
A large number of religious qasā'id have been written in Arabic by the Sufi Shaykh Amadou Bamba Mbacke (1855–1927) from Senegal, West Africa. His qasā'id poetically explore the Qur'an and other learned texts, praising Allah and the prophet, and are considered — both in Senegal as well as in Morocco and other West African countries — as advanced and beautiful poetry. The qasā'id of the Shaykh are today still sung and recited actively by both Mourides belonging to the Sufi Tariqa Mouridiyya, as well as by members of other Sufi Tariqas in Senegal and throughout West Africa, especially the Tijaniyya. The original poetry works of Shaykh Amadou Bamba Mbacke are preserved in a large library in the holy city Touba, Senegal, which was founded by the Shaykh, built by his talibés (students) and considered to be the Capital of Mourides.

Somali
Somali Sufi Sheikhs such as Uways Al-Barawi, Shaykh Sufi, and Al-Zayla'i would often compose Qasida's on religious matters. A well known collection of Somali Qasida's is entitled Majumuʿa Qasaʿid fi Madh Sayyid Al-Anbiya (A Collection of Qasidas in praise of the Master of Prophets).

Hadiyat al-ʿAnam ila Qabr al-Nabi (Guidance of Humanity to the tomb of the Prophet) extols the Prophet Muhammad:

See also 
 Listen to Qasida Radio 
Panegyric, an ancient Greek and Roman equivalent form of poetry
Islam
Sufi poetry
Urdu poetry
Qaṣīdat-ul-Burda
Qawwali
Sufism
Shahr Ashob
The Kasidah, a 19th-century pseudotranslation

References

 Listen to Qasida Radio 
 Qasida Poetry in Islamic Asia and Africa: Vol. 1 Classical Traditions and Modern Meanings, eds Stefan Sperl, C. Shackle, BRILL, 1996
 Qasida Poetry in Islamic Asia and Africa: Vol. 2 Eulogy's Bounty, Meaning's Abundance, eds Stefan Sperl, C. Shackle, BRILL, 1996
 Albert Hourani, A History of the Arab Peoples (London, 1991) p12-13
 Wikipedia on Amadou Bamba and his poetry
 Books about Shaykh Amadou Bamba

External links
 Radio 
Urdu poetic forms

 
Arabic and Central Asian poetics
Urdu-language poetry
Arabic poetry forms
Arab culture
Literary genres
Arabic poetry
Poetic forms